Religion in Washington may refer to:

 Religion in Washington (state)
 Religion in Washington, D.C.